The Buccaneers was a 1956 Sapphire Films television drama series for ITC Entertainment, broadcast by CBS in the US and shown on ATV and regional ITV companies as they came on air during the infancy of ITV in the UK.

Starring Robert Shaw as Dan Tempest, the series, aimed at children, followed the adventures of Tempest and his crew of former pirates as they made their way across the seven seas in Sultana.

This series was one of several swashbuckling adventure series produced during this period by or for Lew Grade's ITC.

Production notes
The series ran for 39 half-hour black-and-white episodes and was produced by Hannah Weinstein and Sidney Cole for Sapphire Films Limited. The episodes were made at Nettlefold Studios at Walton-on-Thames using two studios with seven or eight standing sets. A real schooner was based at Falmouth, Cornwall and a faithful reproduction of part of it in a studio corner.

Rupert Evans, stunt artist, former army teacher of physical training taught Robert Shaw fencing.

The series was set in the Port of Nassau in New Providence of about 1722.

Sources report that Robert Shaw was unavailable for the first few episodes, but nevertheless shooting went ahead without him. In the majority of episodes, he is listed as "With" rather than "Starring" in the title sequence, for reasons that are open to speculation.

The complete series is available on R2 DVD from Network in the UK. There are a number of public-domain DVDs of the series in the North American market, as well as a complete series release.

Cast and characters
 Robert Shaw as Captain Dan Tempest
 Peter Hammond as Lieutenant Edward Beamish
 Brian Rawlinson as Gaff Guernsey
 Paul Hansard as Taffy
 Wilfred Downing as Dickon
 Edwin Richfield as Armando
 Neil Hallett as Boatswain Sam Bassett
 Willoughby Gray as Pop
 Jane Griffiths as Paula
 Alec Mango as Mr. Van Brugh
Various characters were often played by Tony Thawnton, Terence Cooper, Rupert Evans, Roy Purcell and Denis Lacey.

Historical characters
 Blackbeard played by George Margo, Terence Cooper
 Governor Woodes Rogers played by Alec Clunes
 Anne Bonny played by Hazel Court
 Calico Jack played by Brian Worth
 Black Bart played by Alex Scott
 Charles Vane played by Brian Worth
 Ben Hornigold played by Andrew Crawford

Episode list

Airdate is for ATV Midlands ITV regions varied date and order.

Music

The show's ending theme contained the chorus:
Let's go a-roving, a-roving across the ocean
Oh, let's go a-roving and join the buccaneers!
We'll find adventure, adventure across the ocean
Oh, we'll find adventure and join the buccaneers!

Sea shanties and traditional songs were incorporated into the show. Early episodes begin with sailors singing "Blow, Ye Winds, in the Morning," an anachronistic American whaling song. The second episode, "The Raiders," is the only episode to use "The Maid of Amsterdam" as its ending theme. Other songs performed in the show include:
 "Drunken Sailor" (in "Printer's Devil")
 "Haul Away, Joe" (in various episodes including "Dan Tempest's War with Spain")
 "Johnny Come Down to Hilo" (in "Mother Doughty's Crew")
 "O Shenandoah" (in "Gentleman Jack and the Lady")
 "Spanish Ladies" (in "The Ladies")
 "Shake Her, Johnny, Shake Her" (in "Hurricane" and "Flip and Jenny")
 "Venezuela" by John Jacob Niles (in "Mother Doughty's Crew")

DVD and book releases
The Buccaneers (1958) was a Whitman “Big Little Book”: 276 pages half of them are Russ Manning illustrations, the rest are a story written by Alice Sankey.  The adventure story sends Captain Dan Tempest (a buccaneer, or privateer, unofficially serving the English king) and his crew of ex-pirates, after the notorious Blackbeard, and Dan's ship “Sultana” battles with Blackbeard’s famous ship, “Queen Anne's Revenge”. The story includes a treasure map and a treasure, a ship's boy and his cat.

Mill Creek Entertainment released the complete series in Region 1 on 15 August 2006.  This release has been discontinued and is now out of print.

Network Distributing Home Entertainment (under licence from Granada Ventures Ltd) released the complete series in Region 2 on June 1, 2007.

On 19 August 2008, Timeless Media Group released a 3-disc best-of set that features 30 episodes of the series.

References

External links
 Screen Online
 CTA information
 
  Modern map of New Providence.

1956 British television series debuts
1957 British television series endings
British drama television series
Television series by ITC Entertainment
ITV television dramas
Television series about pirates
British adventure television series
1950s British drama television series
Television series set in the 18th century
Black-and-white British television shows
English-language television shows
Nautical television series